Naresh Bhandari  is a Nepalese politician, belonging to the Communist Party of Nepal (Maoist). In the 2008 Constituent Assembly election he was elected from the Jumla-1 constituency, winning 21127 votes.

References

Living people
Communist Party of Nepal (Maoist Centre) politicians
Nepalese atheists
Year of birth missing (living people)
Members of the Provincial Assembly of Karnali Province

Members of the 1st Nepalese Constituent Assembly